
Adherbal was a Carthaginian noble who served as the governor of Gadir (Cadiz) during the Second Punic War. He was also a Carthaginian military commander in this war under the command of Mago Barca. He was one of the lesser generals of the Punic War and was often trying to prove his worth. He is perhaps best known for his defeat in the naval Battle of Carteia in 206BC while attempting to leave Carthaginian Spain with valuable prisoners. His fleet was defeated near the ancient city of Carteia by G. Laelius.

See also
 Other Adherbals in Carthaginian history
 Baal, the Canaanite deity

References

Citations

Bibliography
 . 

Carthaginians
Admirals
3rd-century BC births
Carthaginian commanders of the Second Punic War
Year of birth unknown
3rd-century BC deaths
3rd-century BC Punic people